John Bapst (born Johannes Bapst at La Roche, Fribourg, Switzerland, 17 December 1815; died at Mount Hope, Maryland, United States, 2 November 1887) was a Swiss Jesuit missionary and educator who became the first president of Boston College.

Life
At 12, he began his studies at the College of Fribourg, and on 30 September 1835, he entered the novitiate of the Society of Jesus. He was ordained priest on 31 December 1846 after the usual course of studies and teaching.

Father Bapst arrived in New York in 1848. He was sent to minister to the Penobscot Native Americans at Old Town, Maine, who had been without a priest for 20 years after ten of his predecessors were murdered. Initially ignorant of the Abenaki language spoken in the Penobscot Indian Island Reservation he was able to learn it over three (3) years time.

Father Bapst founded several temperance societies in Maine.

In 1850, he left Old Town for Eastport. His work immediately began to attract attention for its results among Catholics and for the number of converts who were brought into the Church. As his missions covered a large extent of territory, he became generally known throughout the state. When the Know-Nothing excitement broke out, he was at Ellsworth. Protestants Yankees were outraged when he denounced the public school system for forcing a Protestant Bible on Catholic children. He moved to Bangor, Maine.

The Ellsworth town meeting passed a resolution threatening him bodily if he returned. He nevertheless returned to the town on a brief visit in October 1854 and was attacked by ruffians, robbed of his watch and money, tarred and feathered, and ridden out of town on a rail. The incident was met with general condemnation across Maine and the rest of New England.

In Bangor, Maine, Father Bapst built St. John's Catholic Church (Bangor, Maine), the first Catholic church in Bangor, which was dedicated in December 1856. He remained there for three years and was then sent to Boston College as rector of what was the house of higher studies for Jesuit scholastics.

He was afterwards superior of all the Jesuit houses of Canada and New York and then superior of a Residence in Providence, Rhode Island.

See also
John Bapst Memorial High School
 Bapst Library

References

External links

 

1815 births
1887 deaths
Anti-Catholic riots in the United States
Presidents of Boston College
People from the canton of Fribourg
Swiss emigrants to the United States
Swiss Jesuits
19th-century American Jesuits
People from Bangor, Maine
People from Ellsworth, Maine
19th-century Swiss Roman Catholic priests
Boston College people
Know Nothing
Catholics from Maine
Tarring and feathering in the United States